The Boeing Model 95 was a single engine biplane mailplane built by Boeing in the United States in the late 1920s to supplement the Boeing Model 40s being used on Boeing's airmail routes.

Development

While the Model 95 was of the same general configuration as the Model 40, it was larger and more sophisticated aerodynamically and structurally, and was optimized for freight instead of passengers. The fuselage was of far more advanced construction than its predecessor, building on what Boeing had learned about all-metal fuselages while developing the P-12 and F4B fighters, while the wing had stagger and a simplified structure.

Operational history
The majority of Boeing 95s spent their careers flying Boeing's airmail routes, however a small number did find their way to other operators.
At least one Boeing 95 was used by the Honduran Air Force as a bomber. Another Model 95 took part in Boeing-arranged inflight refuelling demonstrations in 1929 but was unsuccessful in either of the two attempts made to fly a round-trip across the continental United States without landing.

Variants
Model 95 standard production version
Model 95A one aircraft built with Pratt & Whitney Wasp engine

Operators

Honduran Air Force

Boeing Air Transport
National Air Transport

Specifications (Model 95)

Accidents and incidents
 On January 10, 1930, a Western Air Express Boeing Air Transport Boeing 95 "NC420E",while flying the US mail on CAM 4 routing from Las Vegas to Salt Lake City crashed in fog and snow south of Cedar City, UT. The pilot, Maurice 'Maury' Graham, survived the crash but died while attempting to hike out. He and the aircraft were found five months later.
 On May 24, 1931, a Pacific Air Transport Boeing 95, registration NC397E, crashed into a mountain near Bellefonte, Pennsylvania in poor visibility, killing the pilot.

See also

References

Citations

Bibliography

 
 

1920s United States cargo aircraft
1920s United States mailplanes
095, Boeing
Single-engined tractor aircraft
Biplanes
Aircraft first flown in 1928